Coffee Run is a stream in the U.S. state of Pennsylvania.

Coffee Run was named from an accident when a group of surveyors spilled their coffee into the stream.

References

Rivers of Pennsylvania
Rivers of Huntingdon County, Pennsylvania